Herman I. Quackenboss (January 8, 1792 Washington County, New York - November 19, 1874 Lansingburgh, Rensselaer County, New York) was an American politician from New York.

Life
He was the son of John H. Quackenboss (1766–1853) and Catrina (Van Woert) Quackenboss (b. 1768). He married Elizabeth, and they had three children. Herman I. Quackenboss was a tanner.

He was a member of the New York State Assembly, from Delaware Co. in 1825; from Greene Co. in 1828; and from New York Co. in 1835.

He was a member of the New York State Senate (3rd D.) from 1831 to 1834, sitting in the 54th, 55th, 56th and 57th New York State Legislatures.

Sources
The New York Civil List compiled by Franklin Benjamin Hough (pages 128ff, 144, 202, 209, 216 and 298; Weed, Parsons and Co., 1858) [gives first name "Herman" on pg. 128ff, 144 and 216, "Harman" on pg. 202, "Harmon" on pg. 209, and erroneously "Henry" on pg. 129]
Quackenboss genealogy at Family Tree Maker [gives first name "Harmen"]
 

1792 births
1874 deaths
People from Washington County, New York
People from Delaware County, New York
People from Greene County, New York
People from Lansingburgh, New York
New York (state) state senators
New York (state) Jacksonians
19th-century American politicians
Members of the New York State Assembly